Ahmi Sharief also known as Ahamsharief, is a village located in Bandipora tehsil of Bandipora district, Jammu and Kashmir, India. The village has total population of 1535 of which 802 are males while 733 are females.

References

Villages in Bandipora district